Independent Hill is an unincorporated town in Prince William County, Virginia. It is located along State Route 234 at the intersection with Joplin Road. The only visible remaining businesses seem to be Samsky's Market (also a Citgo gas station) and Crosby's Crab Company.  In early 2006, a realignment of 234 bypassed the town, leaving it on a side road. The greater Independent Hill area is defined by the Census Bureau as a census-designated place (CDP), with a population of 7,419 as of 2010.

Along with the two businesses listed above, Independent Hill is also the home of the Prince William County School Board Complex. The administrative, support, and maintenance personnel of the school system report there.

The Greenwood Gold Mine operated nearby for a few years before closing in 1885.

References

External links 
Prince William County Government

Census-designated places in Prince William County, Virginia